William Gregory Kennard (born January 27, 1966) is an American politician. He is a Democrat representing the 102nd district in the Georgia House of Representatives.

Career 
Kennard is the founder and senior pastor of NSpire, an outreach program in Atlanta.

In 2018, Kennard was elected to represent District 102 in the Georgia House of Representatives. He is running for re-election in 2020.

Kennard currently sits on the following committees:
 Industry and Labor
 Motor Vehicles
 Small Business Development

Electoral record

Personal life 
Kennard is married and has three children. 
Kennard is a Life Coach.

References 

Living people
Democratic Party members of the Georgia House of Representatives
21st-century American politicians
1966 births